Administratively, Hungary is divided into 19 counties (vármegye, plural vármegyék). In addition, the capital (főváros), Budapest, is independent of any county government. The counties and the capital are the 20 NUTS third-level units of Hungary.

Overview

Regions

Since 1996, the counties and City of Budapest have been grouped into 7 regions for statistical and development purposes. These seven regions constitute NUTS' second-level units of Hungary.

Counties and the capital

There are also 23 towns with county rights (singular megyei jogú város), sometimes known as "urban counties" in English (although there is no such term in Hungarian). The local authorities of these towns have extended powers, but these towns belong to the territory of the respective county instead of being independent territorial units.

Districts

The counties are further subdivided into 174 districts (járások) as of January 1, 2015, which serve as divisions of state administration. 23 districts of the capital city of Budapest are both administrative and self-government units.

Former Divisions
 Administrative divisions of the Kingdom of Hungary
 Counties of Hungary (1000–1920)
 Administrative divisions of the Kingdom of Hungary (1941–44)

See also
 NUTS:HU
 Postal codes in Hungary - including a map of two digit zones

Subdivisions of Hungary